Population reconstruction is a method used by historical demographers. Using records such as church registries the size and composition of families living in a given region in a given past time is determined. This allows the identification and analysis of patterns of family formation, fertility, mortality, and migration, and of consequent trends such as population growth.

See also
One-place study

References
 Paul-André Rosental, The Novelty of an Old Genre: Louis Henry and the Founding of Historical Demography, Population (English edition), Volume 58 –2003/1

Demography